Vladyslav Ivanovych Monchenko (2 April 1932  – 8 February 2016) was a Ukrainian zoologist and ecologist, a prolific copepodologist. He was a full professor and an Academician of the National Academy of Sciences of Ukraine.

Species named in honour of Prof. Monchenko
The 3 genera and 9 species of crustaceans are named in honour of V. I. Monchenko.

Moreover, in 2015 a minor land snail species from Madagascar, Boucardicus monchenkoi, was named in honour of Prof. Monchenko, who collected its first known specimen during expedition in 1991.

References
 Page on the website of I. I. Schmalhausen Institute of Zoology
 2012 biography in Ukrainian

Members of the National Academy of Sciences of Ukraine
20th-century Ukrainian zoologists
Soviet zoologists
Scientists from Moscow
Russian people of Ukrainian descent
1932 births
2016 deaths
Laureates of the State Prize of Ukraine in Science and Technology